Radhakrishna Ramani (21 October 1901 – 30 September 1970) was a prominent Malaysian lawyer and the second president of Malaya Bar Council (Now known as Malaysian Bar Council). As coming from the Malaysian Indian ethnic background, he became the first Asian to be the president of Malaya Bar Council. 
He also served as former Permanent Representative of Malaysia to the United Nations. In 2015 he posthumously received the Lifetime Achievement Award from the Malaysian Bar council.

References

1901 births
1970 deaths
Malaysian people of Indian descent
20th-century Malaysian lawyers